The 1942 Saint Mary's Gaels football team was an American football team that represented Saint Mary's College of California during the 1942 college football season.  In their first season under head coach James Phelan, the Gaels compiled a 6–3–1 record and outscored their opponents by a combined total of 135 to 46.

Halfbacks Joe Verutti and John Podesto led the 1942 Gaels on offense.

Schedule

References

Saint Mary's
Saint Mary's Gaels football seasons
Saint Mary's Gaels football